Fly casting is a competitive variation of fly fishing found in sport fishing and fishing tournaments. This type of sports fishing originated in the Fourteenth Century. The modern version of the sport is supervised by the International Casting Sport Federation (ICSF), which was founded in 1955 and as of April 2014 has member associations in 31 countries. 

The ICSF sponsors tournaments and recognizes world records for accuracy and distance. This sport uses plastic weights or hookless flies, and can be held on water or on athletic fields. There are competitive divisions for almost all types of fly, fixed spool, and revolving spool tackle, and for various classes of competitors. It is included in the World Games (see photo), and has been considered for the Olympics.

The American Casting Association held its 100th Annual Casting Championships in 2008 at the Golden Gate Angling & Casting Club. There are several disciplines in fly casting such as trout accuracy, trout distance, sea trout distance, salmon distance, spey distance etc. A research tool called Fly Casting Analyzer may be used in fly casting.

References

Bibliography
 
 , illustrated fly casting guide by Winner of National, Great Lakes, Midwest, Michigan, and New York Fly Casting Championships.

See also 
 Casting (fishing)
 Fishing tournament
 Fly Casting Analyzer
 Joan Wulff

Fly fishing
Fishing tournaments